NRM may refer to:

 National Railway Museum, York, UK
 National Railway Museum (disambiguation)
 National Record Mart, former US stores 
 National Resistance Movement, a political organisation in Uganda
 Natural remanent magnetization of a rock or sediment
 Natural resource management
 New religious movement or new religion
 Nordic Resistance Movement, a neo-Nazi organization
 Normal Response Mode in the HDLC communications protocol
 N.R.M., a rock band from Minsk, Belarus
 Nucleus raphes medianus, area within the brain
 ISO 639-3 code for Narom language